Ngasepam Pakpi Devi (born 10 March 1981) is a member of the India women's national field hockey team. She played with the team when it won the Gold at the Manchester 2002 Commonwealth Games.

References 
Commonwealth Games Biography

1981 births
Indian female field hockey players
Field hockey players at the 2002 Commonwealth Games
Commonwealth Games gold medallists for India
Living people
Field hockey players from Manipur
Sportswomen from Manipur
Commonwealth Games medallists in field hockey
21st-century Indian women
21st-century Indian people
Medallists at the 2002 Commonwealth Games